Taldumande Youth Services is a youth homelessness service in New South Wales, Australia, founded in 1976.

"Taldumande" is an Aboriginal word meaning "refuge."

Founding of Yfoundations
In 1976, Taldumande along with Young People's Refuge and Caretakers Cottage, and other early NSW youth refuges, founded Yfoundations, a peak body organisation, to represent youth refuges to government.

Going Home Staying Home
Following the NSW Government's "Going Home Staying Home" reforms to the homelessness sector, Taldumande Youth Services joined a partnership with Mission Australia and contracted with the state to provide services in the northern Sydney region. Following the reforms, Taldumande expanded its service.

See also
 Homelessness in Australia
 Youth Homelessness Matters Day

References

External links
Taldumande Youth Services official website

Homelessness in Australia
Homelessness organizations